Château Kirwan is a winery in the Margaux appellation of the Bordeaux region of France. The wine produced here was classified as one of fourteen Troisièmes Crus (Third Growths) in the historic Bordeaux Wine Official Classification of 1855.

Its second wine is called Les Charmes de Kirwan.

Vineyards
Château Kirwan has  of vineyards, planted to 45% Cabernet Sauvignon, 30% Merlot, 15% Cabernet Franc, and 10% Petit Verdot.

The Tribes of Galway

The Kirwan family were one of the Tribes of Galway.

References 

Bordeaux wine producers